Esper or Espers may refer to:

Arts and entertainment
Espers (band), a Philadelphia-based folk group
Espers (album), their eponymous debut album
Espers (comics), a series of comics written by James D. Hudnall and published by Eclipse Comics
Esper Mami, a manga created by Fujiko Fujio
Esper (Final Fantasy), a type of mystical being in a number of the Final Fantasy video games
"Esper", a song by Japanese heavy metal band Loudness from the 1984 album Disillusion
Esper, one of five fictional shards in the Alara block expansion for Magic: The Gathering

Other uses
Esper, Iran, a village in Kohgiluyeh and Boyer-Ahmad Province, Iran
Esper, Missouri, a community in the United States
Esper (name), a list of people with the surname
Esper (software), a software product for complex event processing
ESPer, person who has extrasensory perception

See also
Vespers (disambiguation)